Dir is a tehsil located in Upper Dir District, Khyber Pakhtunkhwa, Pakistan. The population is 439,577 according to the 2017 census.

See also 
 List of tehsils of Khyber Pakhtunkhwa
Rafi Ullah Khan Tesil Chairman Dir

References 

Tehsils of Khyber Pakhtunkhwa
Populated places in Upper Dir District